Justin Swain is an American actor, best known for his role as Detective Mark Bailey in the Netflix series Marvel's Luke Cage.

Early life
Born outside of Boston in Stoneham, Massachusetts, Swain was raised in New Hampshire before he returned to Boston to attend Emerson College.

Career
Swain’s additional acting credits include Oscar nominated film The Post (film) directed by Steven Spielberg, HBO’s “Muhammad Ali’s Greatest Fight”, “The Blacklist”, “Forever”, “Boardwalk Empire”, “Law & Order” and “Law & Order: SVU”.

Alongside his acting career, Swain has written for film and television. He has developed pilots under the guidance of Christina Wayne (“Mad Men” and “Breaking Bad”) and Academy Award and Emmy winning producer Cary Brokaw (“The Player”, “Closer”, and “Angeles in America”).

Swain is also an award-winning playwright whose work has been commissioned by multiple theater companies and performed in New York City at 46East 46th Street in the Dread Awakening Theater festival alongside Roberto Aguirre Sacasa as well as The Ohio Theater, The Henry Street Settlement and The American Place Theatre. His plays have also been produced in New York, Chicago, and Miami.

Filmography

References

External links
 

Year of birth missing (living people)
Living people
People from Stoneham, Massachusetts
American male television actors